In the Hurricane's Eye: The Genius of George Washington and the Victory at Yorktown is a book by American writer Nathaniel Philbrick about the events leading to the defeat of the British at Yorktown with the aid of the French. The book was published by Viking Press on October 16, 2018.

Reception
In a 2018 book review in Kirkus Reviews the review summarized the book as "A tense, richly detailed narrative of the American Revolution." Carol Berkin, writing for The Washington Post called Philbrick "a master of narrative" and "To his credit, Philbrick resists the temptation to descend into hagiography."

References 

2018 non-fiction books
Viking Press books